This is a list of episodes for the television series Arthur.

During the course of the series, Arthur has aired a total of 253 episodes and 7 specials. The series began airing on October 7, 1996, and ended on February 21, 2022. Seasons 1–15 were produced by Cookie Jar Group (seasons 1–8 as CINAR, seasons 9–15 as Cookie Jar Entertainment after the CINAR-Cookie Jar rebrand), seasons 16–19 by 9 Story Media Group (after Cookie Jar merged with DHX Media), and seasons 20–25 were produced by Oasis Animation, along with 4 new hour-long television specials. Seven television specials aired in 2000, 2002, 2017 (2 separate specials), 2020 (2 separate specials), 2021, and a CGI movie released in 2006, titled Arthur's Missing Pal.

Series overview

Episodes

Season 1 (1996)

Season 2 (1997–98)

Season 3 (1998–99)

Season 4 (1999)

Season 5 (2000)

Season 6 (2001)

Season 7 (2002)

Season 8 (2003)

Season 9 (2004–05)

Season 10 (2006)

Season 11 (2007)

Season 12 (2008–09)

Season 13 (2009–10)

Season 14 (2010–11)

Season 15 (2011–12)

Season 16 (2012–13)

Season 17 (2013–14)

Season 18 (2014–15)

Season 19 (2015–16)

Season 20 (2016–17)

Season 21 (2017–18)

Season 22 (2019)

Season 23 (2019)

Season 24 (2021)

Season 25 (2022)

Specials

CGI movie

Notes

References

Episodes
Arthur
Arthur